is a 2005 Japanese film directed by Seijun Suzuki. The "raccoon" of the English title is actually a translation for the tanuki or Japanese raccoon-dog. It is a love story set in the musical genre and stars Zhang Ziyi as a tanuki princess and Joe Odagiri as the banished prince she falls in love with. The film premiered at the 2005 Cannes Film Festival.

Plot
The Lord of Castle Grace, Azuchi Momoyama (Mikijiro Hira), is used to ask a prophetess (Saori Yuki) to confirm he is the fairest of all living things. On one occasion, the prophetess reveals that his son Prince Amechiyo (Joe Odagiri) will soon become the fairest. Azuchi Momoyama orders his son to be killed at Sacred Mountain. The plan fails when the assassin is trapped by racoon hunters. While Amechiyo sleeps, Princess Racoon (Zhang Ziyi), finds him and takes him to the Raccoon Palace. Soon, Amechiyo and the Princess are in love. The Racoons are against the romance because it is a known law that "No man should love a racoon. Even less should a racoon ever love a man". Azuchi Monoyama learns his son is still alive so he engages in a war to get him killed. Amechiyo has to look for a golden frog deep in the mountain to save the princess. It appears that the lovers' romance is doomed.

Cast
 Zhang Ziyi as Princess Raccoon
 Joe Odagiri as Amechiyo
 Hiroko Yakushimaru as Hagi
 Mikijiro Hira as Azuchi Momoyama
 Tarō Yamamoto
 Gentaro Takahashi
 Saori Yuki

References

External links
 
 
 Official website  at Kadokawa-Herald Pictures, Inc.

2005 films
2000s Japanese-language films
2000s Mandarin-language films
2000s musical fantasy films
Films directed by Seijun Suzuki
Japanese musical fantasy films
Shochiku films
Films scored by Michiru Ōshima
2000s Japanese films